Helicon is an Israeli record label.

History
Helicon Records was founded in 1985. Aside from being the label of many Israeli singers, Helicon was the exclusive distributor of Snapper Music, EMI and Universal Music Group (replacing PolyGram) in Israel. In 2012, Helicon acquired the distribution rights of High Fidelity, another Israeli record label.

See also
 List of record labels
 Music of Israel

Israeli record labels
Record labels established in 1985
Pop record labels
IFPI members
1985 establishments in Israel